The United States Fleet Marine Force, Pacific (FMFPAC) is the largest maritime landing force in the world.  Its units are spread across the Pacific Ocean and reports to the United States Pacific Command.  It is headquartered at MCB Camp H. M. Smith, HI and directs and commands all the subordinate elements of the Navy Expeditionary Strike Force and Marine Air-Ground Task Force components that follow under the 3rd, 5th, and 7th Fleet and the Marine Corps Forces, Pacific (MARFORPAC).  The Commanding General of Marine Corps Forces, Pacific is dual-posted as the Commanding General of Fleet Marine Force, Pacific. FMFPAC is under operational control of the Commander, United States Pacific Fleet (COMPACFLT), when deployed.

FMFPac was established by General 'Howling Mad' Smith in 1944 to assume command of very large USMC forces in the Pacific, of the order of 500,000.

Organization
Reporting directly to the Commanding General, Fleet Marine Force, Pacific (CG FMFPAC) are the Commanding Generals of two Marine Expeditionary Forces (I MEF and III MEF), the Commanding Generals of two Marine Expeditionary Brigades (1st MEB and
3rd MEB), and the Commanding Officers of four Marine Expeditionary Units (11th, 13th, 15th, and 31st MEUs).

The Commanding General, I MEF, exercises operational control over the 1st Marine Division, the 3rd Marine Aircraft Wing, and the 1st Marine Logistics Group, while the Commanding General, III MEF, exercises operational control over the 3d Marine Division, the 1st Marine Aircraft Wing, and the 3rd Marine Logistics Group.

Hierarchy of Fleet Marine Force units
Commander, United States Pacific Fleet (COMPACFLT)

Camp H. M. SmithAiea, Hawaii

Marine Forces, Pacific (MARFORPAC)

Marine Forces, Central (MARCENT)

Marine Forces, Korea (MARFORK)

See also
Advanced Base Force
Fleet Marine Force, Atlantic (FMFLANT)
Marine Corps Forces, Pacific (MARFORPAC)
Marine Corps Forces, Command (MARFORCOM) [formerly Marine Corps Forces, Atlantic (MARFORLANT)]

References

External links
http://www.globalsecurity.org/military/library/report/1989/SJH.htm
http://www.globalsecurity.org/military/library/report/1995/MJS.htm

Military units and formations of the United States Marine Corps

de:Fleet Marine Force